Jenny Mowe (born February 25, 1978) is an American former professional basketball player. She was the 20th pick in the 2001 WNBA draft, selected by the Portland Fire.

High school
Mowe attended Powers High School in Powers, Oregon. In 1995, she led the Powers High School Cruisers to the Class 1A title. Mowe held 14 1A state tournament records until the records were reset during the reclassification of Oregon high schools.

College
Mowe was the first Oregon Duck to get drafted into the WNBA. She later coached at Baker High School.

Personal life 
On June 9, 2007, Mowe married Loran Joseph of Baker City.

In 2011 Mowe started her own business in Baker City, Sweet Wife Baking. In 2016 Sweet Wife Baking won the Oregon State Parks Downtown Revitalization Award for Business of the Year.

International competition
1999 USA Women’s World University Games Team- silver medal
1997 USA Junior World Championship team- gold medal 
1996 USA Junior World Championship Qualifying team

References

External links
Jenny Mowe WNBA Stats | Basketball-Reference.com
WNBA.com: Jenny Mowe Player Info
Jenny Mowe's Bakery: Sweet Wife Baking

1978 births
Living people
American women's basketball players
American women's basketball coaches
Centers (basketball)
Los Angeles Sparks players
Oregon Ducks women's basketball players
People from Baker City, Oregon
Portland Fire players
Henan Phoenix players
American expatriate basketball people in China
Universiade silver medalists for the United States
Universiade medalists in basketball
Medalists at the 1999 Summer Universiade